Ancistronychus is an extinct genus of drepanosaur from the Late Triassic Petrified Forest National Park in the Chinle Formation of Arizona. The type and only known species is Ancistronychus paradoxus, from Ancient Greek to mean "unexpected fishhook claw" due to its characteristic hooked shape. Ancistorhynchus is only known from a collection of isolated large claws from its second fingers, a distinctive trait of other derived drepanosaurs. Ancistorhynchus is characteristic amongst drepanosaurs by the strongly hooked shape of its claw, which is shorter in height and broader than those of Drepanosaurus, and is flat at its tip. The claw is also cleft at its tip, a trait found in living animals that use their claws for digging, such as moles and pangolins, by providing a larger attachment area for the keratin sheath of the claw. Likewise, functional analyses of its claws compared to other drepanosaurs and various living animals indicates that Ancistronychus used its large claw for digging underground, perhaps even for burrowing.

References

Drepanosaurs
Late Triassic reptiles of North America
Fossil taxa described in 2019
Prehistoric reptile genera